Erik Karl Hugo Ring (born 24 April 2002) is a Swedish professional footballer who plays as a winger for AIK.

Career 
Ring is a youth product of Huddinge and Segeltorps, before joining the youth academy of AIK in 2017. He signed his first professional contract with AIK on 9 September 2020, keeping him at the club until 31 December 2024. He made his professional debut with the club in a 3–0 Allsvenskan win over Hammarby on 20 September 2020.

International career
Ring is a youth international for Sweden, having been called up to represent the Sweden U21 in October 2021.

References

External links
 
 Svensk Fotbool Profile

2002 births
Living people
People from Södertälje
Swedish footballers
Sweden under-21 international footballers
Association football wingers
AIK Fotboll players
Allsvenskan players
Sportspeople from Stockholm County